Opharus euchaetiformis is a moth of the family Erebidae. It was described by Henry Edwards in 1884. It is found in Mexico.

References

Opharus
Moths described in 1884
Moths of Central America